The men's singles wheelchair tennis competition at the 2000 Summer Paralympics in Sydney was held at the Sydney Olympic Park Tennis Centre.

Australia's David Hall defeated the United States' Stephen Welch in the final, 6–7, 6–4, 6–2 to win the gold medal in men's singles wheelchair tennis at the 2000 Sydney Paralympics. In the bronze medal match, Germany's Kai Schramayer defeated Austria's Martin Legner.

The Netherlands' Ricky Molier was the defending gold medalist, but was defeated by Legner in the quarterfinals.

Draw

Key
 INV = Bipartite invitation
 IP = ITF place
 ALT = Alternate
 r = Retired
 w/o = Walkover

Finals

Top half

Section 1

Section 2

Bottom half

Section 1

Section 2

References 
 

Men's singles